Kimberley Grace "Kim" Ruddins (born September 3, 1963 in Los Angeles, California) is a retired female volleyball player from the United States, who won the silver medal with the USA National Women's Team at the 1984 Summer Olympics in Los Angeles, California. She played as a setter.  She played college women's volleyball with the USC Trojans.

References
 
 US Olympic Team
 Atari Magazines

1963 births
Living people
American women's volleyball players
Volleyball players at the 1984 Summer Olympics
Volleyball players at the 1988 Summer Olympics
Olympic silver medalists for the United States in volleyball
Volleyball players from Los Angeles
USC Trojans women's volleyball players
Medalists at the 1984 Summer Olympics
Pan American Games medalists in volleyball
Pan American Games silver medalists for the United States
Pan American Games bronze medalists for the United States
Medalists at the 1983 Pan American Games
Medalists at the 1987 Pan American Games